Walter Riml (September 23, 1905 – June 21, 1994) was an Austrian cameraman and actor.

Life 

Born in Innsbruck, the 2.05 m tall Tyrolean at first was trained as a carpenter and an interior designer. As a passionate sportsman and skier he contacted the Mountain film-pioneer Arnold Fanck who made a film in the Tyrolean area of Arlberg in 1927. Fanck engaged him as a grip for the silent movie The Great Leap where Walter Riml appeared also in some short scenes. Fanck loved the artistic and humorous side of Walter Riml's talents and so he played a major role in Fanck's famous film The White Ecstasy (1931). Together with other already famous actors like Leni Riefenstahl, Hannes Schneider, Rudi Matt, Gustav Diessl and the pilot Ernst Udet Walter Riml played also in Abenteuer im Engadin or S.O.S. Eisberg and showed his further talent for the film business in The White Ecstasy.

Walter Riml played the tall carpenter "Fietje" from Hamburg together with his petite carpenter-partner "Tietje" Guzzi Lantschner, both in the traditional black carpenter costumes. Their ski acrobatic scenes became legendary until today. This film is also a favourite film for today's snowboarding generation because of the fabulous ski jumps.

Another film with these two comedians was North Pole, Ahoy filmed in Greenland, directed by Andrew Marton, produced by Universal Films. This film was a parodistic story in connection with S.O.S. Eisberg. Walter Riml was interested in becoming a professional cameraman and very soon into his career  he got his visual education from two famous cameramen Hans Schneeberger and Richard Angst. Because of his visual talents Leni Riefenstahl committed to him as her still-photographer and as a second cameraman for her first movie Das blaue Licht (The Blue Light). The most famous photos of Leni Riefenstahl as the witch "Junta" from this film were shot by Walter Riml. This fact she mentioned in her book "Im Kampf in Schnee und Eis". Walter Riml became a great cameraman and expert for mountain films. Therefore, Luis Trenker engaged him several times. In the 30es, Walter Riml filmed in Japan Die Tochter des Samurai (1936) together with Arnold Fanck.

Because of a bomb attack in 1944 in Berlin he lost his archive with more than 30,000 negatives from his travels and works in Japan and Greenland. Therefore, planned film projects together with the American film producer Paul Kohner could not be realised any more.

After the Second World War he was a cameraman for the US Army.  In 1957 he was one of the four western cameramen who were allowed to make a film about the daily life in Russia. Riml also worked on different TV productions.

Until the mid-1960s Walter Riml made a lot of the typical and famous mountain films and films with regional background. One of them is the famous film Two Times Lotte based on the book by Erich Kästner. In 1962 the American director John Sturges engaged him as a second cameraman for his film The Great Escape  with stars like Steve McQueen, Richard Attenborough and Charles Bronson. As a specialist for films in snow atmosphere he filmed scenes in the James Bond film On Her Majesty's Secret Service in 1969. His last filmwork was in 1970, a documentary for US television about the film The Last Valley with Michael Caine and Omar Sharif.

Walter Riml died at the age of 89 in the year 1994 in Steinach am Brenner. In his long life he worked on more than 100 film productions and documentaries worldwide.

List of films

Actor

Cameraman

Literature
 Gesprengte Ketten: The Great Escape, Behind the Scenes, Photographs of cameraman Walter Riml, Editor Helma Türk & Christian Riml, House Publishing 2013, English/German

References

External links
 Homepage of Walter Riml 
 Info about the shooting of TGE and the Photo Book The Great Escape
 
 Biography with Photo

1905 births
1994 deaths
Austrian male film actors
Austrian photographers
Actors from Innsbruck
Austrian cinematographers
20th-century Austrian male actors
Film people from Innsbruck